Prince of Wales Secondary School is a public secondary school located in Vancouver, British Columbia, Canada.

History
Prince of Wales is named in honour of the Prince of Wales, the heir apparent to the Canadian throne. The ostrich feather and crown symbol, and the Ich dien motto of the school are identical to those of its namesake. Prince of Wales opened for classes in September 1920 at its original site, which is now Shaughnessy Elementary School. In 1960 it moved to its current location, which had previously been a golf course.

Programs offered

Mini School Program
Prince of Wales Mini School is a district mini school program  of 140 students that seeks students from Vancouver who have demonstrated above average academic achievement and involvement in school and community. Each year, students attend outdoor education trips to strengthen the community and learn new skills.

Electives
Prince of Wales offers a variety of electives that appeal to student interests, which range from applied skills such as home economics, stagecraft, technical education, and business education, to fine arts (graphic design, filmmaking, photography, art, choir, music). Many students pursue these electives for personal interest, or they choose these courses because they will be studying in this fields for their post-secondary programs. For example, many students take senior level accounting, marketing, and economics courses offered at PW and go on to study Commerce / Business in their post-secondary program.

TREK Outdoor Education Program
The TREK program is offered for grade 10 students from schools throughout the Vancouver School District with an interest in outdoor activities and environmental education.

The program admits 112 students each year, who are get to go on various outdoor trips throughout their school year. The program finishes most of the regular grade 10 academic curriculum while being able to participate in outdoor activities, including both overnight and day trips that teach basic outdoor skills, minimum impact camping, hiking and backpacking, ocean kayaking, canoeing, rock climbing, back-country (telemark) skiing, cross-country (Nordic) skiing, snow shelter building & winter camping, avalanche awareness, cycle touring, outdoor cooking, and map & compass navigation, and in-class focus on sustainability and the environment.

GOLD Program

The Gifted Over Learning Disabled (GOLD) Program is a district program designed for gifted students who have also been identified as having a learning disability. The acceptance rate is very low with an average of only about 8 students per year. Students in the program have at least one GOLD block as part of their regular timetable with GOLD English also being offered at the grade 8 level. The curriculum of the program includes communication skills, decision making, subject and personal support, self-awareness and self-advocacy.

Timetable
Prince of Wales formerly operated on a linear timetable of Day 1 / Day 2 rotation, from early September to late June. Each day has four (4) blocks with 1 hour and 15 minutes of instruction in each block. Classes begin at 8:55 a.m. and end at 3:03 p.m. Due to COVID-19 during the 2020-2021 schoolyear Prince of Wales operated on a quarter system with two classes per quarter. Classes were in session from 8:40 to 12:32 or from 1:18 to 3:03 depending on whether you had morning classes or afternoon classes. During the first quarter one class was online and one was in person and it would switch every two weeks but that later changed to switching every week. In the last two quarters both classes were in person.

Currently during the 2022-2023 school year, Prince of Wales operates on a semester system like other schools in the Vancouver School Board, with 4 classes every semester. Classes run from 8:40 to 3:06.

Prince of Wales sports
Prince of Wales sports teams are named Walesmen. Prince of Wales sports teams include Cross-country, Bantam Boys Rugby, Juvenile Boys Rugby, Bantam Girls Volleyball, Juv/Junior Girls Volleyball, Senior Girls Volleyball, Swimming, Girls Basketball, Bantam Girls Basketball, Juvenile Girls Basketball, Jr/Senior Girls Basketball, Boys Basketball, Bantam Boys Basketball, Juv/Junior Boys Basketball, Senior Boys Basketball, Grade 8/Juvenile Girls Soccer, Tennis, Gymnastics, Ultimate, Girls Softball, Track & Field, Junior Boys Rugby, Senior Boys Rugby, Badminton, and Golf as well as inter-mural sports, such as hand-ball. They are known for its tabletennis. Walesmen  reached the top 8 of Bantam Boys' Basketball for the second year in a row(21-22, 22-23).

Notable alumni
Kim Campbell, First female Prime Minister of Canada.
Deborah Grey, First Reform Party member of Parliament.
Spencer Chandra Herbert, first MLA for Vancouver West End, youngest elected Vancouver Park Commissioner.
Emmanuelle Schick Garcia, film director/screenwriter.
Bruce Fairbairn, music producer for Bon Jovi, Aerosmith, AC/DC, Loverboy, Van Halen, Chicago, The Cranberries and KISS.
Lawrence Chou, Hong Kong actor, singer.
Jessie Farrell, Canadian country music award-winning singer.  
Rafe Mair, broadcaster, political analyst.
Andrea Neil, pioneer of women’s soccer in Canada and first woman to be inducted for soccer into Canada's Sport Hall of Fame.
Peter New, actor, voice actor and screenwriter with roles in Agent Cody Banks, Diary of a Wimpy Kid and Antitrust.
Nicholas Lea, actor best known for his portrayal of Alex Krycek from The X-Files and as star/producer of Whistler.
Sara Neil, Olympic cyclist, winner of the bronze medal in the 57 km road race at the 1987 Pan American games.
Jenny Pat, Hong Kong-born, Chinese-Canadian international art dealer, visual artist, and television personality.
Ryan Reynolds, Hollywood actor, attended the Trek program for one year
Tseng Kwong Chi, Hong Kong-born American Photographer, Artist.
Peter Kelamis, Actor and Comedian.

See also
Monarchy in British Columbia

References

High schools in Vancouver
Educational institutions established in 1920
1920 establishments in British Columbia